Darko Lukanović (born 1 June 1984) is a Swedish professional footballer who plays as a forward.

Early life
Born in Tuzla, SFR Yugoslavia, Lukanović immigrated to Sweden in his teens, playing youth football with both Falkenbergs FF and Malmö FF. With the latter, with which he remained four-and-a-half years, he won the junior championship and the 2004 Allsvenskan title.

Club career
Remaining in the country, Lukanović signed in January 2005 with Assyriska Föreningen, which were playing in the top flight for the first time ever. In August, he moved to Belgium with Royal Antwerp FC, where he played 84 games – including both friendly and competitive matches – during his four-year spell with the second division team. In the 2007–08 season, he spent time on loan at fellow league side K.V.K. Tienen.

In the 2009 autumn, Lukanović joined CF Atlético Ciudad in Spain. During his only season with the Murcians, he ranked second in goals scored to help them finish in seventh position in Segunda División B, but the club folded shortly after.

In October 2011, after a brief spell back in his country, Lukanović agreed to a one-year contract with Romanian club CSU Voința Sibiu. He continued competing in the country in the following years, in both its Liga I and Liga II.

References

External links

1984 births
Living people
Croats of Bosnia and Herzegovina
Bosnia and Herzegovina emigrants to Sweden
Sportspeople from Tuzla
Swedish footballers
Association football forwards
Allsvenskan players
Falkenbergs FF players
Malmö FF players
Assyriska FF players
IF Limhamn Bunkeflo (men) players
Landskrona BoIS players
Challenger Pro League players
Royal Antwerp F.C. players
K.V.K. Tienen-Hageland players
Segunda División B players
Liga I players
Liga II players
CSU Voința Sibiu players
CSM Ceahlăul Piatra Neamț players
FC Rapid București players
Football League (Greece) players
Kallithea F.C. players
Slovenian PrvaLiga players
FC Koper players
Swedish expatriate footballers
Expatriate footballers in Belgium
Expatriate footballers in Spain
Expatriate footballers in Romania
Expatriate footballers in Vietnam
Expatriate footballers in Greece
Expatriate footballers in Slovenia
Swedish expatriate sportspeople in Belgium
Swedish expatriate sportspeople in Spain
Swedish expatriate sportspeople in Romania
Swedish expatriate sportspeople in Greece
Swedish expatriate sportspeople in Slovenia